The Intellectual Property Lawyers' Organisation or The Intellectual Property Lawyer's Organisation (TIPLO) is a United Kingdom-based association of intellectual property lawyers.

See also 
 Intellectual property organization

References

External links 
 

Intellectual property organizations